Jean Lennox Bird (8 July 1912 – 29 April 1957) was a pioneering pilot and the first woman to be awarded RAF wings.

Early life 
Jean Lennox Bird was born in Hong Kong on 8 July 1912, the second daughter of Lt Col. Lennox Godfrey Bird, an architect who designed several buildings in Hong Kong and Shanghai. Her father retired in 1935, and the family returned home, eventually settling at the Old Farm, in Beech, near Alton, Hampshire England.

Bird started flying at the age of eighteen and took lessons, alongside her father, at the Hampshire Aeroplane Club in Hamble, during a visit home. Both qualified on 2 October 1930.

War service
By the time Second World War broke out in 1939 Bird was an experienced pilot. She was commissioned into the Women’s Auxiliary Air Force (WAAF) as Assistant Section Officer (ASO) in 1940 and remained there for a year until invited to join the ATA.

Bird joined the Air Transport Auxiliary (ATA) on 1 August 1941 and soon qualified as a First Officer. The aircraft she ferried included: Hurricanes, Spitfires, Wellingtons, Beaufighters, Mosquitos and Dakotas. She served with the ATA until the organisation closed down at the end of the war, on 30 November 1945.

Post-war
In 1946, Bird piloted a single-engine air taxi from Durban, South Africa to Britain to help a young bride attend her wedding in Croydon.

In September 1949 Bird was commissioned into the Women's RAF Volunteer Reserve (WRAFVR), as a Pilot Officer, as were a number of the ATA women pilots. During their 5-year commissions, several women took up the opportunity to become fully qualified RAF pilots and Bird duly became the first woman ever to wear the flying badge of an RAF Pilot: the 'Wings'. She was awarded her wings, amid some publicity, at Redhill Aerodrome on 20 September 1952. By the time she qualified, Bird had 3,000 hours in more than 90 different types of aircraft.

The next target was to gain membership of the all-male RAF Club in Piccadilly. Pilot Officer Bird's application was apparently successful, but membership was rejected when this officer's gender was discovered.

When the force was re-established during the Cold War, Bird then became a member, from December 1955, of the 3rd Hants (Alton) Battalion of the Home Guard, one of 16 women to do so. She also worked with the Women’s Junior Air Corps, training young women to fly, and was also a glider pilot. 

Bird's main occupation in the 1950s was in the developing field of photographic aerial survey, working for Meridian Air Maps. On 29 April 1957, she was surveying the proposed route of a new road, when her 'Aerovan' twin-engined freight plane crashed and she was killed. The coroner's verdict was accidental death, although evidence was given that the aircraft had been fitted with an incorrect spare part.

Bird is commemorated by the Jean Lennox Bird Trophy of the British Women Pilots’ Association. This Chinese antique, a carving in jade to recall her early flying-days in Hong Kong, is awarded annually to a British woman pilot who has also made a noteworthy contribution to aviation.

First five
Jean Bird, Benedetta Willis, Jackie Moggridge, Freydis Leaf and Joan Hughes were the first five women to be awarded their wings. The next to gain wings was Julie Ann Gibson in 1991.

References

Sources
 
 
 
 
 
 
 
 
 
 
 

British aviators
1912 births
1957 deaths
British women aviators
Air Transport Auxiliary pilots
British women in World War II
Women's Auxiliary Air Force officers
Aviators killed in aviation accidents or incidents in England
British expatriates in Hong Kong